Galvani Bioelectronics is a Stevenage, United Kingdom-based bioelectronics R&D company.

History
It was founded by Alphabet Inc. subsidiary Verily Life Sciences and British pharmaceutical company GlaxoSmithKline (GSK) in November 2016. The partnership to form the company was announced on 1 August 2016.

Verily has a 45% equity interest, while GSK has a 55% equity interest, making GSK the effective owner. The initial agreed upon investment between the two companies is up to £540 million over a period of seven years and will be used "to develop prototype devices aimed at controlling a variety of chronic conditions." Additionally, both companies agreed to contribute their existing intellectual property rights.

References

External links 
 Announcement by GSK

GSK plc
Verily
Biotechnology companies of the United Kingdom
Companies based in Stevenage
2016 establishments in England
Biotechnology companies established in 2016